Réseau Express de l'Aire métropolitaine Lyonnaise (or Real) is a project that consists in improving and unifying some railways lines in the Lyon metropolitan area. It is said to be a "RER à la lyonnaise" (a sort of RER in Lyon). 
The most significative project is the "tram-train" in west area of Lyon urban area in 2011 and better frequencies of the trains.

This project comes from the "Schéma régional des transports" of 1997 and has been initiated by many entities : région Rhône-Alpes, Communauté urbaine de Lyon, Sytral and SNCF, and several departements (Rhône, Loire, Isère, Ain).

See also 

Transports en commun lyonnais
Transports in Rhône-Alpes
Lyon

Rapid transit in France
Rail transport in Lyon